Morabinae is a subfamily of grasshoppers, wholly endemic to Australia. Around 240 species of Morabinae are known to exist.

References

Caelifera
Orthoptera subfamilies